The Carmen graecum de herbis (Greek poem about herbs) is a treatise written by anonymously by a Greek between the 2nd and the 3rd century AD. It consists of 215 lines written in ionic Greek dialect.

References

External links
Poetae bucolici et didactici. Theocritus, Bion, Moschus, Nicander, Oppianus, Marcellus de piscibus, poeta de herbis, C. Fr. Ameis, F. S. Lehrs (ed.), Parisiis, editore Ambrosio Firmin Didot, 1862, pp. 173-178.
Macer Floridus de viribus herbarum una cum Walafridi Strabonis, Othonis Cremonensis et Ioanni Folcz carminibus argumenti, accedunt anonymi carmen graecum de herbis, Ludovicus Choulant, Iulius Sillig (ed.), Lipsiae, sumptibus Leopoldi Vossii, 1832, pp. 197 ff.

Greek writers
2nd-century Latin books
3rd-century Latin books